Preseka may refer to the following places:

Bulgaria
 Preseka, Bulgaria

Croatia
 Preseka, Croatia

North Macedonia
 Preseka, Kočani

Serbia
 Preseka (Babušnica)
 Preseka (Ivanjica)

Poland
 Silesian Przesieka, densely forested area in the middle of Silesia